Schefflera marlipoensis is a species of plant in the family Araliaceae. It is endemic to China and India.  As of 2004, it is classified as "Critically Endangered. It is in the kingdom of Plantae, phylum of Tracheophyta, class of magnoliopsida, and the order of apiales.

References

Flora of China
marlipoensis
Critically endangered plants
Taxonomy articles created by Polbot